The Osterman Weekend is a thriller novel by Robert Ludlum. First published in 1972, it was the author's second book.  The novel was the basis for the film of the same title.

Plot
John Tanner, Director of News of a US TV network, is convinced by a CIA agent that the friends he has invited to a weekend in the country are engaged in a conspiracy, called Omega, that threatens national security. Everything John Tanner thinks he knows about his closest friends is overturned, and he is set against them. When Omega finally reveals itself, he realizes that he has been manipulated from the very start.

References

1972 American novels
American novels adapted into films
Conspiracy
Novels by Robert Ludlum
English-language novels
Political thriller novels
American political novels
American thriller novels
World Publishing Company books